

Events

Pre-1600
 769 – The Lateran Council ends by condemning the Council of Hieria and anathematizing its iconoclastic rulings.
1071 – Bari, the last Byzantine possession in southern Italy, is surrendered to Robert Guiscard.
1450 – Battle of Formigny: Toward the end of the Hundred Years' War, the French attack and nearly annihilate English forces, ending English domination in Northern France.

1601–1900
1632 – Battle of Rain: Swedes under Gustavus Adolphus defeat the Holy Roman Empire during the Thirty Years' War.
1642 – Irish Confederate Wars: A Confederate Irish militia is routed in the Battle of Kilrush when it attempts to halt the progress of a Royalist Army.
1715 – The Pocotaligo Massacre triggers the start of the Yamasee War in colonial South Carolina.
1736 – Foundation of the short-lived Kingdom of Corsica.
1738 – Serse, an Italian opera by George Frideric Handel, receives its premiere performance in London, England.
1755 – Samuel Johnson's A Dictionary of the English Language is published in London.
1817 – Thomas Hopkins Gallaudet and Laurent Clerc found the American School for the Deaf (then called the Connecticut Asylum for the Education and Instruction of Deaf and Dumb Persons), the first American school for deaf students, in Hartford, Connecticut.
1861 – President Abraham Lincoln calls for 75,000 Volunteers to quell the insurrection that soon became the American Civil War.
1865 – President Abraham Lincoln dies after being shot the previous evening by actor John Wilkes Booth. Three hours later, Vice President Andrew Johnson is sworn in as President.
1892 – The General Electric Company is formed.
1896 – Closing ceremony of the Games of the I Olympiad in Athens, Greece.
1900 – Philippine–American War: Filipino guerrillas launch a surprise attack on U.S. infantry and begin a four-day siege of Catubig, Philippines.

1901–present
1912 – The British passenger liner  sinks in the North Atlantic at 2:20 a.m., two hours and forty minutes after hitting an iceberg. Only 710 of 2,224 passengers and crew on board survive.
1920 – Two security guards are murdered during a robbery in South Braintree, Massachusetts. Anarchists Sacco and Vanzetti would be convicted of and executed for the crime, amid much controversy.
1922 – U.S. Senator John B. Kendrick of Wyoming introduces a resolution calling for an investigation of a secret land deal, which leads to the discovery of the Teapot Dome scandal.
1923 – Insulin becomes generally available for use by people with diabetes.
  1923   – Racially motivated Nihon Shōgakkō fire lit by serial arsonist in kills 10 children in Sacramento, California.
1936 – First day of the Arab revolt in Mandatory Palestine.
1941 – In the Belfast Blitz, two hundred bombers of the German Luftwaffe attack Belfast, killing around one thousand people.
1942 – The George Cross is awarded "to the island fortress of Malta" by King George VI.
1945 – Bergen-Belsen concentration camp is liberated.
1947 – Jackie Robinson debuts for the Brooklyn Dodgers, breaking baseball's color line.
1952 – First flight of the Boeing B-52 Stratofortress.
1955 – McDonald's restaurant dates its founding to the opening of a franchised restaurant by Ray Kroc, in Des Plaines, Illinois.
1960 – At Shaw University in Raleigh, North Carolina, Ella Baker leads a conference that results in the creation of the Student Nonviolent Coordinating Committee, one of the principal organizations of the civil rights movement in the 1960s.
1969 – The EC-121 shootdown incident: North Korea shoots down a United States Navy aircraft over the Sea of Japan, killing all 31 on board.
1970 – During the Cambodian Civil War, massacre of the Vietnamese minority results in 800 bodies flowing down the Mekong river into South Vietnam.
1986 – The United States launches Operation El Dorado Canyon, its bombing raids against Libyan targets in response to a discotheque bombing in West Germany that killed two U.S. servicemen.
1989 – Hillsborough disaster: A human crush occurs at Hillsborough Stadium, home of Sheffield Wednesday, in the FA Cup Semi-final, resulting in the deaths of 97 Liverpool fans.
  1989   – Upon Hu Yaobang's death, the Tiananmen Square protests of 1989 begin in China.
1994 – Marrakesh Agreement relating to foundation of World Trade Organization is adopted.
2002 – Air China Flight 129 crashes on approach to Gimhae International Airport in Busan, South Korea, killing 129 people.
2013 – Two bombs explode near the finish line at the Boston Marathon in Boston, Massachusetts, killing three people and injuring 264 others.
  2013  – A wave of bombings across Iraq kills at least 75 people.
2014 – In the worst massacre of the South Sudanese Civil War, at least 200 civilians are gunned down after seeking refuge in houses of worship as well as hospitals.
2019 – The cathedral of Notre-Dame de Paris in France is seriously damaged by a large fire.
2021 –  A Mass shooting occurred at a Fedex Ground facility in Indianapolis, Indiana, killing 9 and injuring 7

Births

Pre-1600
68 BC – Gaius Maecenas, Roman politician (d. 8 BC)
1282 – Frederick IV, Duke of Lorraine (d. 1329)
1442 – John Paston, English noble (d. 1479)
1452 – Leonardo da Vinci, Italian painter, sculptor, and architect (d. 1519)
1469 – Guru Nanak, the first Sikh guru (d. 1539)
1552 – Pietro Cataldi, Italian mathematician and astronomer (d. 1626)
1563 – Guru Arjan Dev, fifth Sikh leader (d. 1606)
1588 – Claudius Salmasius, French author and scholar (d. 1653)
1592 – Francesco Maria Brancaccio, Catholic cardinal (d. 1675)

1601–1900
1641 – Robert Sibbald, Scottish physician and geographer (d. 1722)
1642 – Suleiman II, Ottoman sultan (d. 1691)
1646 – Christian V of Denmark (d. 1699)
1684 – Catherine I of Russia (d. 1727)
1688 – Johann Friedrich Fasch, German violinist and composer (d. 1758)
1707 – Leonhard Euler, Swiss mathematician and physicist (d. 1783)
1710 – William Cullen, Scottish physician and chemist (d. 1790)
1741 – Charles Willson Peale, American painter and soldier (d. 1827)
1771 – Nicolas Chopin, French-Polish educator (d. 1844)
1772 – Étienne Geoffroy Saint-Hilaire, French biologist and zoologist (d. 1844)
1793 – Friedrich Georg Wilhelm von Struve, German astronomer and academic (d. 1864)
1795 – Maria Schicklgruber, mother of Alois Hitler and the paternal grandmother of Adolf Hitler (d.1847)
1800 – James Clark Ross, English captain and explorer (d. 1862)
1808 – William Champ, English-Australian politician, 1st Premier of Tasmania (d. 1892)
1809 – Hermann Grassmann, German linguist and mathematician (d. 1877)
1817 – William Crowther, Dutch-Australian politician, 14th Premier of Tasmania (d. 1885)
1828 – Jean Danjou, French captain (d. 1863)
1832 – Wilhelm Busch, German poet, painter, and illustrator (d. 1908)
1841 – Mary Grant Roberts, Australian zoo owner (d. 1921)
  1841   – Joseph E. Seagram, Canadian businessman and politician, founded the Seagram Company Ltd (d. 1919)
1843 – Henry James, American novelist, short story writer, and critic (d. 1916)
1856 – Jean Moréas, Greek poet and critic (d. 1910)
1858 – Émile Durkheim, French sociologist, psychologist, and philosopher (d. 1917)
1861 – Bliss Carman, Canadian-British poet and playwright (d. 1929)
1863 – Ida Freund, Austrian-born chemist and educator (d. 1914)
1874 – George Harrison Shull, American botanist and geneticist (d. 1954)
  1874   – Johannes Stark, German physicist and academic, Nobel Prize laureate (d. 1957)
1875 – James J. Jeffries, American boxer and promoter (d. 1953)
1877 – Georg Kolbe, German sculptor (d. 1947)
1877 – William David Ross, Scottish philosopher (d. 1971)
1878 – Robert Walser, Swiss author and playwright (d. 1956)
1879 – Melville Henry Cane, American lawyer and poet (d. 1980)
1883 – Stanley Bruce, Australian captain and politician, 8th Prime Minister of Australia (d. 1967)
1885 – Tadeusz Kutrzeba, Polish general (d. 1947)
1886 – Nikolay Gumilyov, Russian poet and critic (d. 1921)
1887 – Felix Pipes, Austrian tennis player (d. 1983)
  1887   – William Forgan Smith, Scottish-Australian politician, 24th Premier of Queensland (d. 1953)
1888 – Maximilian Kronberger, German poet and author (d. 1904)
1889 – Thomas Hart Benton, American painter and educator (d. 1975)
  1889   – A. Philip Randolph, American activist (d. 1979)
1890 – Percy Shaw, English businessman, invented the cat's eye (d. 1976)
1892 – Theo Osterkamp, German general and pilot (d. 1975)
  1892   – Corrie ten Boom, Dutch-American clocksmith, Nazi resister, and author (d. 1983)
1894 – Nikita Khrushchev, Russian general and politician, 7th Premier of the Soviet Union (d. 1971)
  1894   – Bessie Smith, African-American singer and actress (d. 1937)
1895 – Clark McConachy, New Zealand snooker player (d. 1980)
  1895   – Abigail Mejia, Dominican feminist activist, nationalist, literary critic and educator (d. 1941)
1896 – Nikolay Semyonov, Russian physicist and chemist, Nobel Prize laureate (d. 1986)
1898 – Harry Edward, Guyanese-English sprinter (d. 1973)

1901–present
1901 – Joe Davis, English snooker player (d. 1978)
  1901   – Ajoy Mukherjee, Indian politician, Chief Minister of West Bengal (d. 1986)
  1901   – René Pleven, French businessman and politician, Prime Minister of France (d. 1993)
1902 – Fernando Pessa, Portuguese journalist (d. 2002)
1903 – John Williams, English-American actor (d. 1983)
1904 – Arshile Gorky, Armenian-American painter and illustrator (d. 1948)
1907 – Nikolaas Tinbergen, Dutch-English ethologist and ornithologist, Nobel Prize laureate (d. 1988)
1908 – eden ahbez, Scottish-American songwriter and recording artist (d. 1995)
  1908   – Lita Grey, American actress (d. 1995)
1910 – Sulo Bärlund, Finnish shot putter (d. 1986)
  1910   – Miguel Najdorf, Polish-Argentinian chess player and theoretician (d. 1997)
1912 – William Congdon, American-Italian painter and sculptor (d. 1998)
  1912   – Kim Il-sung, North Korean general and politician, 1st Supreme Leader of North Korea (d. 1994)
1915 – Elizabeth Catlett, African-American sculptor and illustrator (d. 2012)
1916 – Alfred S. Bloomingdale, American businessman (d. 1982)
  1916   – Helene Hanff, American author and screenwriter (d. 1997)
1917 – Hans Conried, American actor (d. 1982)
  1917   – Elmer Gedeon, American baseball player and bomber pilot (d. 1944)
  1917   – James Kee, American lawyer and politician (d. 1989)
1918 – Hans Billian, German film director, screenwriter, and actor (d. 2007)
1919 – Alberto Breccia, Uruguayan-Argentinian author and illustrator (d. 1993)
1920 – Godfrey Stafford, English-South African physicist and academic (d. 2013)
  1920   – Thomas Szasz, Hungarian-American psychiatrist and academic (d. 2012)
  1920   – Richard von Weizsäcker, German soldier and politician, 6th President of Germany (d. 2015)
1921 – Georgy Beregovoy, Ukrainian-Russian general, pilot, and astronaut (d. 1995)
  1921   – Angelo DiGeorge, American physician and endocrinologist (d. 2009)
1922 – Michael Ansara, Syrian-American actor (d. 2013)
  1922   – Hasrat Jaipuri, Indian poet and songwriter (d. 1999)
  1922   – Harold Washington, American lawyer and politician, 51st Mayor of Chicago (d. 1987)
  1922   – Graham Whitehead, English racing driver (d. 1981)
1923 – Artur Alliksaar, Estonian poet and author (d. 1966)
  1923   – Robert DePugh, American activist, founded the Minutemen (an anti-Communist organization) (d. 2009)
1924 – M. Canagaratnam, Sri Lankan politician (d. 1980)
  1924   – Rikki Fulton, Scottish comedian (d. 2004)
  1924   – Neville Marriner, English violinist and conductor (d. 2016)
1926 – Jurriaan Schrofer, Dutch sculptor, designer, and educator (d. 1990)
1927 – Robert Mills, American physicist and academic (d. 1999)
1929 – Gérald Beaudoin, Canadian lawyer and politician (d. 2008)
  1929   – Adrian Cadbury, English rower and businessman (d. 2015)
1930 – Georges Descrières, French actor (d. 2013)
  1930   – Vigdís Finnbogadóttir, Icelandic educator and politician, 4th President of Iceland
1931 – Kenneth Bloomfield, Northern Irish civil servant
  1931   – Tomas Tranströmer, Swedish poet, translator, and psychologist Nobel Prize laureate (d. 2015)
1933 – Roy Clark, American musician and television personality (d. 2018)
  1933   – David Hamilton, English-French photographer and director (d. 2016)
  1933   – Elizabeth Montgomery, American actress and producer (d. 1995)
1935 – Stavros Paravas, Greek actor and producer (d. 2008)
1936 – Raymond Poulidor, French cyclist (d. 2019)
1937 – Bob Luman, American singer-songwriter and guitarist (d. 1978)
  1937   – Robert W. Gore, American engineer and businessman, co-inventor of Gore-Tex (d. 2020)
1938 – Claudia Cardinale, Italian actress
  1938   – Hso Khan Pha, Burmese-Canadian geologist and politician (d. 2016)
1939 – Marty Wilde, English singer-songwriter and actor
  1939   – Desiré Ecaré, Ivorian filmmaker (d. 2009)
1940 – Jeffrey Archer, English author, playwright, and politician
  1940   – Penelope Coelen, South African actress, model, beauty queen and 1958 Miss World
  1940   – Willie Davis, American baseball player and actor (d. 2010)
  1940   – Robert Lacroix, Canadian economist and academic
  1940   – Robert Walker, American actor (d. 2019)
1941 – Howard Berman, American lawyer and politician
1942 – Francis X. DiLorenzo, American bishop (d. 2017)
  1942   – Walt Hazzard, American basketball player and coach (d. 2011)
  1942   – Kenneth Lay, American businessman and criminal(d. 2006)
  1942   – Tim Lankester, English economist and academic
1943 – Pınar Kür, Turkish author, playwright, and academic
  1943   – Robert Lefkowitz, American physician and biochemist, Nobel Prize laureate
  1943   – Veronica Linklater, Baroness Linklater, English politician
  1943   – Hugh Thompson, Jr., American soldier and pilot (d. 2006)
1944 – Dave Edmunds, Welsh singer-songwriter, guitarist, and producer 
1946 – John Lloyd, Scottish journalist and author
  1946   – Pete Rouse, American politician, White House Chief of Staff
1947 – Linda Bloodworth-Thomason, American screenwriter and producer
  1947   – Martin Broughton, English businessman
  1947   – Lois Chiles, American model and actress
  1947   – David Omand, English civil servant and academic
  1947   – Cristina Husmark Pehrsson, Swedish nurse and politician, Swedish Minister for Social Security
1948 – Christopher Brown, English historian, curator, and academic
  1948   – Michael Kamen, American composer and conductor (d. 2003)
  1948   – Phil Mogg, English singer-songwriter and musician
1949 – Alla Pugacheva, Russian singer-songwriter and actress
  1949   – Craig Zadan, American director, producer, and screenwriter (d. 2018)
1950 – Josiane Balasko, French actress, director, and screenwriter
  1950   – Amy Wright, American actress
  1950   – Karel Kroupa, Czech football player
1951 – Heloise, American journalist and author
  1951   – John L. Phillips, American captain and astronaut
  1951   – Stuart Prebble, English journalist and producer
  1951   – Marsha Ivins, American engineer and astronaut
1952 – Kym Gyngell, Australian actor, comedian, and screenwriter
  1952   – Brian Muir, English sculptor and set designer
  1952   – Avital Ronell, Czech-American philosopher and academic
  1952   – Glenn Shadix, American actor, (d. 2010)
1955 – Dodi Fayed, Egyptian film producer (d. 1997) 
  1955   – Joice Mujuru, Zimbabwean politician  
1956 – Michael Cooper, American basketball player and coach
1957 – Evelyn Ashford, American runner and coach
1958 – Keith Acton, Canadian ice hockey player and coach
  1958   – John Bracewell, New Zealand cricketer
  1958   – Memos Ioannou, Greek basketball player and coach
  1958   – Benjamin Zephaniah, English actor, author, poet, and playwright
1959 – Fruit Chan, Chinese director, producer, and screenwriter
  1959   – Kevin Lowe, Canadian ice hockey player, coach, and manager
  1959   – Emma Thompson, English actress, comedian, author, activist and screenwriter
1960 – Pierre Aubry, Canadian ice hockey player
  1960   – Susanne Bier, Danish director and screenwriter
  1960   – Pedro Delgado, Spanish cyclist and sportscaster
  1960   – Tony Jones, English snooker player
1961 – Neil Carmichael, English academic and politician
  1961   – Carol W. Greider, American molecular biologist
  1961   – Dawn Wright, American geographer and oceanographer
1962 – Nawal El Moutawakel, Moroccan athlete and politician
  1962   – Tom Kane, American voice actor
1963 – Alex Crawford, Nigerian-South African journalist
  1963   – Manzoor Elahi, Pakistani cricketer
  1963   – Manoj Prabhakar, Indian cricketer and sportscaster
1964 – Andre Joubert, South African rugby player
  1964   – Lee Kernaghan, Australian singer-songwriter and guitarist 
1965 – Soichi Noguchi, Japanese engineer and astronaut
  1965   – Linda Perry, American singer-songwriter, musician and record producer
  1965   – Kevin Stevens, American ice hockey player
1966 – Samantha Fox, English singer-songwriter and actress
  1966   – Mott Green, American businessman (d. 2013)
1967 – Frankie Poullain, Scottish bass player and songwriter 
  1967   – Dara Torres, American swimmer and journalist
1968 – Ben Clarke, English rugby player and coach
  1968   – Brahim Lahlafi, Moroccan-French runner
  1968   – Ed O'Brien, English guitarist 
1969 – Jeromy Burnitz, American baseball player
  1969   – Kaisa Roose, Estonian pianist and conductor
  1969   – Jimmy Waite, Canadian-German ice hockey player and coach
1970 – Chris Huffins, American decathlete and coach
1971 – Philippe Carbonneau, French rugby player
  1971   – Finidi George, Nigerian footballer 
  1971   – Jason Sehorn, American football player 
  1971   – Josia Thugwane, South African runner
  1971   – Karl Turner, English lawyer and politician
1972 – Arturo Gatti, Italian-Canadian boxer (d. 2009)
  1972   – Lou Romano, American animator and voice actor
1974 – Kim Min-kyo, South Korean actor and director
  1974   – Danny Pino, American actor and screenwriter
  1974   – Mike Quinn, American football player
  1974   – Douglas Spain, American actor, director, and producer
  1974   – Tim Thomas, American ice hockey player
1975 – Sarah Teichmann, German-American biophysicist and immunologist
1976 – Jason Bonsignore, Canadian ice hockey player and coach
  1976   – Darius Regelskis, Lithuanian footballer
  1976   – Kęstutis Šeštokas, Lithuanian basketball player
  1976   – Steve Williams, English rower
1977 – Sudarsan Pattnaik, Indian sculptor
  1977   – Brian Pothier, American ice hockey player
1978 – Milton Bradley, American baseball player
  1978   – Tim Corcoran, American baseball player
  1978   – Luis Fonsi, Puerto Rican-American singer-songwriter and dancer
  1978   – Chris Stapleton, American country singer-songwriter and guitarist 
1980 – Patrick Carney, American drummer, musician, and producer
  1980   – James Foster, English cricketer
  1980   – Raül López, Spanish basketball player
  1980   – Willie Mason, New Zealand-Australian rugby league player
  1980   – Aida Mollenkamp, American chef and author
  1980   – Billy Yates, American football player
1981 – Andrés D'Alessandro, Argentinian footballer
1982 – Michael Aubrey, American baseball player
  1982   – Anthony Green, American singer-songwriter 
  1982   – Seth Rogen, Canadian-American actor, director, producer, and screenwriter
1983 – Alice Braga, Brazilian actress
  1983   – Matt Cardle, English singer-songwriter and guitarist 
  1983   – Dudu Cearense, Brazilian footballer
  1983   – Andreas Fransson, Swedish skier (d. 2014)
  1983   – Ilya Kovalchuk, Russian ice hockey player
  1983   – Martin Pedersen, Danish cyclist
1984 – Antonio Cromartie, American football player
  1984   – Cam Janssen, American ice hockey player
  1984   – Daniel Paille, Canadian ice hockey player
1985 – Ryan Hamilton, Canadian ice hockey player
1986 – Tom Heaton, English footballer
  1986   – Sylvain Marveaux, French footballer
1988 – Blake Ayshford, Australian rugby league player
  1988   – Steven Defour, Belgian footballer
  1988   – Chris Tillman, American baseball pitcher
1989 – Darren Nicholls, Australian rugby league player
1990 – Emma Watson, English actress
1991 – Daiki Arioka, Japanese idol, singer, and actor
  1991   – Javier Fernández López, Spanish figure skater
1992 – Jeremy McGovern, Australian rules football player
1994 – Brodie Grundy, Australian rules football player
  1994   – Shaunae Miller-Uibo, Bahamian sprinter
1995 – Leander Dendoncker, Belgian footballer
1997 – Ashleigh Gardner, Australian cricketer 
1999 – Denis Shapovalov, Canadian tennis player
2001 – Shanti Dope, Filipino rapper

Deaths

Pre-1600
 628 – Suiko, emperor of Japan (b. 554)
 943 – Liu Bin, emperor of Southern Han (b. 920)
 956 – Lin Yanyu, Chinese court official and eunuch
1053 – Godwin, Earl of Wessex (b. 1001)
1136 – Richard Fitz Gilbert de Clare (b. 1094)
1220 – Adolf of Altena, German archbishop (b. 1157)
1237 – Richard Poore, English ecclesiastic
1415 – Manuel Chrysoloras, Greek philosopher and translator (b. 1355)
1446 – Filippo Brunelleschi, Italian sculptor and architect (b. 1377)
1502 – John IV of Chalon-Arlay, Prince of Orange (b. 1443)
1558 – Roxelana, wife of Suleiman the Magnificent (b. c. 1500)
1578 – Wolrad II, Count of Waldeck-Eisenberg, German nobleman (b. 1509)

1601–1900
1610 – Robert Persons, English Jesuit priest, insurrectionist, and author (b. 1546)
1632 – George Calvert, 1st Baron Baltimore, English politician, English Secretary of State (b. 1580)
1652 – Patriarch Joseph of Moscow, Russian patriarch
1659 – Simon Dach, German poet and hymnwriter (b. 1605)
1719 – Françoise d'Aubigné, Marquise de Maintenon, French wife of Louis XIV of France (b. 1635)
1754 – Jacopo Riccati, Italian mathematician and academic (b. 1676)
1757 – Rosalba Carriera, Italian painter (b. 1673)
1761 – Archibald Campbell, 3rd Duke of Argyll, Scottish lawyer and politician, Lord President of the Court of Session (b. 1682)
  1761   – William Oldys, English historian and author (b. 1696)
1764 – Peder Horrebow, Danish astronomer and mathematician (b. 1679)
  1764   – Madame de Pompadour, mistress of King Louis XV (d. 1764)
1765 – Mikhail Lomonosov, Russian chemist and physicist (b. 1711)
1788 – Giuseppe Bonno, Austrian composer (b. 1711)
1793 – Ignacije Szentmartony, Croatian priest, mathematician, and astronomer (b. 1718)
1854 – Arthur Aikin, English chemist and mineralogist (b. 1773)
1861 – Sylvester Jordan, Austrian-German lawyer and politician (b. 1792)
1865 – Abraham Lincoln, 16th President of the United States (b. 1809)
1888 – Matthew Arnold, English poet and critic (b. 1822)
1889 – Father Damien, Belgian priest and saint (b. 1840)
1898 – Te Keepa Te Rangihiwinui, New Zealand commander and politician

1901–present
1912 – Victims of the Titanic disaster:
Thomas Andrews, Irish shipbuilder (b. 1873)
John Jacob Astor IV, American colonel, businessman, and author (b. 1864)
Archibald Butt, American general and journalist (b. 1865)
Jacques Futrelle, American journalist and author (b. 1875)
Benjamin Guggenheim, American businessman (b. 1865)
Henry B. Harris, American producer and manager (b. 1866)
Wallace Hartley, English violinist and bandleader (b. 1878)
Charles Melville Hays, American businessman (b. 1856)
James Paul Moody, English Sixth Officer (b. 1887)
William McMaster Murdoch, Scottish First Officer (b. 1873)
Jack Phillips, English telegraphist (b. 1887)
Edward Smith, English Captain (b. 1850)
William Thomas Stead, English journalist (b. 1849)
Ida Straus, German-American businesswoman (b. 1849)
Isidor Straus, German-American businessman and politician (b. 1845)
John B. Thayer, American business and sportsman (b. 1862)
Henry Tingle Wilde, English chief officer (b. 1872)
1917 – János Murkovics, Slovene author, poet, and educator (b. 1839)
1927 – Gaston Leroux, French journalist and author (b. 1868)
1938 – César Vallejo, Peruvian journalist, poet, and playwright (b. 1892)
1942 – Robert Musil, Austrian-Swiss author and playwright (b. 1880)
1943 – Aristarkh Lentulov, Russian painter and set designer (b. 1882)
1944 – Nikolai Fyodorovich Vatutin, Russian general (b. 1901)
1945 – Hermann Florstedt, German SS officer (b. 1895)
1948 – Radola Gajda, Montenegrin-Czech general and politician (b. 1892)
1949 – Wallace Beery, American actor, director, and screenwriter (b. 1885)
1962 – Clara Blandick, American actress (b. 1880)
  1962   – Arsenio Lacson, Filipino journalist and politician, Mayor of Manila (b. 1912)
1963 – Edward Greeves, Jr., Australian footballer (b. 1903)
1966 – Habibullah Bahar Chowdhury, Bengali politician, writer, journalist, first health minister of East Pakistan
1967 – Totò, Italian comedian (b. 1898)
1971 – Gurgen Boryan, Armenian poet and playwright (b. 1915)
  1971   – Friedebert Tuglas, Estonian author and critic (b. 1886)
1979 – David Brand, Australian politician, 19th Premier of Western Australia (b. 1912)
1980 – Raymond Bailey, American actor and soldier (b. 1904)
  1980   – Jean-Paul Sartre, French philosopher and author, Nobel Prize laureate (b. 1905)
1982 – Arthur Lowe, English actor (b. 1915)
1984 – Tommy Cooper, Welsh comedian and magician (b. 1921)
1986 – Jean Genet, French novelist, poet, and playwright (b. 1910)
1988 – Kenneth Williams, English actor and screenwriter (b. 1926)
1989 – Hu Yaobang, Chinese soldier and politician, former General Secretary of the Chinese Communist Party (b. 1915)
1990 – Greta Garbo, Swedish-American actress (b. 1905)
1993 – Leslie Charteris, English author and screenwriter (b. 1907)
  1993   – John Tuzo Wilson, Canadian geophysicist and geologist (b. 1908)
1998 – William Congdon, American-Italian painter and sculptor (b. 1912)
  1998   – Pol Pot, Cambodian general and politician, 29th Prime Minister of Cambodia (b. 1925)
1999 – Harvey Postlethwaite, English engineer (b. 1944)
2000 – Edward Gorey, American poet and illustrator (b. 1925)
2001 – Joey Ramone, American singer-songwriter (b. 1951)
2002 – Damon Knight, American author and critic (b. 1922)
  2002   – Byron White, American football player, lawyer, and jurist, 4th United States Deputy Attorney General (b. 1917)
2004 – Mitsuteru Yokoyama, Japanese illustrator (b. 1934)
2007 – Brant Parker, American illustrator (b. 1920)
2008 – Krister Stendahl, Swedish bishop, theologian, and scholar (b. 1921)
2009 – Clement Freud, German-English journalist, academic, and politician (b. 1924)
  2009   – László Tisza, Hungarian-American physicist and academic (b. 1907)
  2009   – Salih Neftçi, Turkish economist and author (b. 1947)
2010 – Jack Herer, American author and activist (b. 1939)
  2010   – Michael Pataki, American actor and director (b. 1938)
2011 – Vittorio Arrigoni, Italian journalist, author, and activist (b. 1975)
2012 – Paul Bogart, American director and producer (b. 1919)
  2012   – Dwayne Schintzius, American basketball player (b. 1968)
2013 – Benjamin Fain, Ukrainian-Israeli physicist and academic (b. 1930)
  2013   – Richard LeParmentier, American-English actor and screenwriter (b. 1946)
  2013   – Jean-François Paillard, French conductor (b. 1928)
2014 – John Houbolt, American engineer and academic (b. 1919)
  2014   – Eliseo Verón, Argentinian sociologist and academic (b. 1935)
2015 – Jonathan Crombie, Canadian-American actor and screenwriter (b. 1966)
  2015   – Surya Bahadur Thapa, Nepalese politician, 24th Prime Minister of Nepal (b. 1928)
2017 – Clifton James, American actor (b. 1920)
  2017   – Emma Morano, Italian supercentenarian, last person verified born in the 1800s (b. 1899)
2018 – R. Lee Ermey, American actor (b. 1944) 
  2018   – Vittorio Taviani, Italian film director and screenwriter (b. 1929)
2022 – Bilquis Edhi, Pakistani philanthropist and wife of Abdul Sattar Edhi (b. 1947)
  2022   – Henry Plumb, British politician and farmer (b. 1925)
  2022   – Liz Sheridan, American actress (b. 1929)

Holidays and observances
Christian feast day:
Abbo II of Metz
Father Damien (The Episcopal Church)
Hunna
Paternus of Avranches
April 15 (Eastern Orthodox liturgics)
Day of the Sun (North Korea)
Father Damien Day (Hawaii)
Hillsborough Disaster Memorial (Liverpool, England)
Jackie Robinson Day (United States)
National American Sign Language Day (United States)
Pohela Boishakh (Bengali New Year; India)
Tax Day, the official deadline for filing an individual tax return (or requesting an extension). (United States, Philippines)
Universal Day of Culture 
World Art Day

References

External links

 BBC: On This Day
 
 Historical Events on April 15

Days of the year
April